The 1998 WTA German Open was a women's tennis tournament played on outdoor clay courts at the Rot-Weiss Tennis Club in Berlin in Germany that was part of Tier I of the 1998 WTA Tour. It was the 29th edition of the tournament and was held from 11 May through 17 May 1998. Conchita Martínez won the singles title.

Finals

Singles

 Conchita Martínez defeated  Amélie Mauresmo 6–4, 6–4
 It was Martínez's 2nd title of the year and the 35th of her career.

Doubles

 Lindsay Davenport /  Natasha Zvereva defeated  Alexandra Fusai /  Nathalie Tauziat 6–3, 6–0
 It was Davenport's 3rd title of the year and the 34th of her career. It was Zvereva's 2nd title of the year and the 75th of her career.

External links
 ITF tournament edition details
 Tournament draws

WTA German Open
WTA German Open
1998 in German tennis